55 Lower Fort Street, Millers Point is a heritage-listed former house and now professional offices located at 55 Lower Fort Street, in the inner city Sydney suburb of Millers Point, in the City of Sydney local government area of New South Wales, Australia. The property was added to the New South Wales State Heritage Register on 2 April 1999.

History 

In April 2000 the property sold for 2.35 million.

Description

Completed in the Victorian Regency style, the building is currently occupied by Tropman and Tropman Architects.

Heritage listing 
Building was listed on the New South Wales State Heritage Register on 2 April 1999.

See also 

Australian residential architectural styles
47-53 Lower Fort Street
Regency Townhouses, 57-61 Lower Fort Street

References

Attribution

External links
 

New South Wales State Heritage Register sites located in Millers Point
Articles incorporating text from the New South Wales State Heritage Register
Lower Fort Street, Millers Point, 55